The 1527 election in Cetin (meaning Parliament on Cetin(grad) or Parliament of Cetin(grad), or ) was an assembly of the Croatian Parliament in the Cetin Castle in 1527. It followed a succession crisis in the Kingdom of Hungary caused by the death of Louis II, and which resulted in the Kingdom of Croatia joining the Habsburg monarchy. The charter electing the Habsburg Archduke of Austria Ferdinand I as King of Croatia was confirmed with the seals of six Croatian nobles.

Battle of Mohács and the succession crisis

Faced with the overwhelming force of the Ottoman Empire, the nobility of the Kingdom of Croatia was alarmed as the Siege of Belgrade of 1521 caused the Kingdom of Hungary to lose its last fortress on the Danube to Suleiman the Magnificent. King Louis II showed no interest in defense, and was in a dire financial situation at the time. The Croatians appealed to the Pope, Venice, Emperor Charles V and Archduke Ferdinand for help, but had little success.

The majority of Croatian magnates and members of lower nobility were keen to elect a new king. The gathering (sabor) was caused by a monarchical crisis after the death of King Louis II and a major defeat of the Kingdom of Hungary at the Battle of Mohács on 29 August 1526. The young King Louis II was "King of Croatia and Dalmatia" among his other titles, but left no legitimate heir.

At the session of Hungarian parliament in Székesfehérvár on 10 November 1526, the majority of the Hungarian untitled lesser nobility (the gentry) chose John Zápolya to be the King of Hungary, and he was duly crowned the next day under the name King John I of Hungary. However, Ferdinand of Habsburg was also elected King of Hungary by the Hungarian higher aristocracy (the magnates or barons) and the Hungarian Catholic clergy in a rump Diet in Pozsony on 17 December 1526. Accordingly, Ferdinand also was crowned as King of Hungary in the Székesfehérvár Basilica on 3 November, 1527.

Cetin
The Croatian nobles met at Cetin on December 31, 1526, to discuss their strategy and choose a new leader. The Austrian Archduke Ferdinand also sent his envoys to be present at the time of the Parliament session. The assembly occurred in the Franciscan monastery of St. Mary below the Cetin Castle in the settlement of Cetingrad. At that time, the owner of the castle and the surrounding estate, where the assembly was held, was the Croatian noble Juraj III Frankopan.

Advocates of both options, after a long debate, finally agreed on Ferdinand on January 1, 1527. The election of Ferdinand was a natural one because he was not only the powerful Archduke of Austria, he also ruled the lands of Croatia's Slavic neighbours, the Slovenes, as both Duke of Carinthia and Carniola. Ferdinand I was elected the new King of Croatia, and the assembly "confirmed the succession to him and his heirs".

In return for the throne Ferdinand promised to respect the historic rights, freedoms, laws, and customs the Croats had when united with the Hungarian kingdom, and to defend Croatia from Ottoman invasion and subjugation at all times with 1000 horsemen, 200 soldiers, and finance for another 800 horsemen. He also had an obligation to inspect and supply the fortified cities.

Charter

The charter signed by the Croatian nobles, which bears a fine example of the chequered seal of Croatia, is claimed as "among the most important documents of Croatian statehood", showing a special political status of Croatia at that time coming out of it. The charter confirmed at the same time the ancient rights of Croatian nobility to self-regulate the major issues – among which was the election of a king – freely and independently, regardless of opinion or decision of Hungarian Diet, since the two countries were in the personal union from 1102.

The text of the Charter contains first the listing of names of the present Croatian high nobility members, church dignitaries and low nobility members, as well as names and titles of Ferdinand's plenipotentiaries, then the quotation of arguments for the legally valid election of a Habsburger to be the hereditary ruler of Croatia, further the declaratory statement of recognition and announcement of the Austrian archduke as king and his wife Anna (sister of Louis II) as queen, and finally "the swearing-in of loyalty, obedience and allegiance". Place and date of issue are specified at the end of the text as well.

The mentioned Croatian nobles are Andrija the Bishop of Knin and Abbot of Topusko, Ivan Karlović of Krbava, Nikola III Zrinski, brothers Krsto II and Vuk I Frankopan of Tržac, Juraj III Frankopan of Slunj, Stjepan Blagajski, Krsto Peranski, Bernard Tumpić Zečevski (of Zečevo), Ivan Kobasić Brikovički (of Brekovica), Pavao Janković, Gašpar Križanić, Toma Čipčić, Mihajlo Skoblić, Nikola Babonožić, Grgur Otmić, noble judge of the Zagreb County, Antun Otmić, Ivan Novaković, Pavao Izačić, Gašpar Gusić, and Stjepan Zimić, while the Austrian plenipotentiaries present were Paul von Oberstein (Provost of Vienna and Ferdinand's Geheimrat), Nikola Jurišić and Ivan Katzianer (Ferdinand's chief military commanders), and Johann Püchler (Prefect of the town of Mehov).

Seals

Beneath the text there are six seals of most notable Croatian magnates and dignitaries to verify the Charter, as well in the middle a seal of the Kingdom of Croatia, in the following sequence:

Left side
 Andrija Tuškanić (or Andrija Mišljenović Uzdoljski), Bishop of Knin
 Ivan Karlović, from the Kurjaković branch of the Gusić's, Ban of Croatia 1521–1524 and 1527–1531.
 Nikola III Zrinski, from the Zrinski branch of the Šubić's.

Center
 A chequered seal of the Kingdom of Croatia.

Right side
 Juraj III Frankopan, from the Slunj branch of the Frankopan's.
 Vuk I. Frankopan, from the Tržac branch of the Frankopan's.
 Stjepan Blagajski, from the Blagaj branch of the Babonić's.

Aftermath
Ferdinand's plenipotentiaries took over the Charter from the Croats and took it with them on their way back to Vienna. In return, earlier that day, in a document called Coronation Oath, they confirmed the promises and assurances of Ferdinand (given before upon the previous demands of the Croats), and accepted all the related obligations and responsibilities of the new-elected king.

Before their return to Vienna, the plenipotentiaries wrote a letter to their principal on 3 January 1527 in which they informed him about the sequence of events during the Parliament session and explained their delay and longer stay in Croatia than expected before (among other things, some of Croatian magnates did not have their seals with them, but needed to go home and to verify the Charter afterwards).

On January 6, 1527, the Slavonian nobility distanced themselves from this election and nominated John Zápolya the rival claimant to the Hungarian throne instead. A civil war erupted, with Ferenc Batthyány leading the pro-Habsburg faction and Christoph Frankopan leading the pro-Zápolya faction. The Austrian option ultimately prevailed after Zápolya's death in 1540.

Legacy
The charter is preserved at the National Archives of Austria in Vienna.

The Constitution of Croatia describes these events as one of the historical foundations of Croatian sovereignty, as an "independent and sovereign decision of the Croatian Parliament".

See also
Croatia in the union with Hungary

Sources
 
 Milan Kruhek:

Notes

External links
 Cetingrad Charter in the Austrian lexicon
 Text of the Charter
 Letter addressed to Ferdinand Habsburg (Archive.org)

1527 in the Habsburg monarchy
16th century in the Habsburg monarchy
16th-century elections
1527 in Europe
16th century in Croatia
History of Dalmatia
Historical legislatures
16th century in international relations
Cetingrad
1527 in Croatia
Ferdinand I, Holy Roman Emperor